Eureka Pass is a mountain pass in the southern Princess Margaret Range of central Axel Heiberg Island, Nunavut, Canada.

References

Arctic Cordillera
Mountain passes of Qikiqtaaluk Region